Des Moines Roller Derby (DMRD), formerly known as Team United Roller Derby (TURD), is a flat track roller derby league located in Des Moines, Iowa. It consists of two travel teams: a WFTDA charter team, and an Open Division all gender team. DMRD is a member of the Women's Flat Track Derby Association (WFTDA).

History
The league was founded in early 2013, with most of its founders being former skaters for the Mid Iowa Rollers. It was coached by Mark Muse, also the coach of nearby Your Mom Men's Derby.  The All Stars team saw rapid success, beating Minnesota RollerGirls' All Stars in December.

The league affiliated with the Women's Flat Track Derby Association (WFTDA), completing its Apprentice Program in 2014.  The following year, it began taking on WFTDA Division 1 teams, nearly beating the Rocky Mountain Rollergirls.

In December 2019, the league underwent a complete rebrand, changing its name, logo, coaching, and leadership structure (including Board of Directors/Executive Board) to better suit its mission. The league is currently skater-coached.

WFTDA Competition
By 2015, Team United had absorbed most of the skaters from the Des Moines Derby Dames. Later that year, Team United qualified for the WFTDA Division 1 Playoff in Tucson, and took seventh place, with a 191-165 victory over Charm City Roller Girls. For the 2016 Madison Division 1 Playoff Team United came in as the fifth seed, and finished in fifth place by defeating Helsinki Roller Derby 206-155.

In 2017, Team United did not meet the required minimum of sanctioned gameplay to be eligible for WFTDA Playoffs, although they were ranked at 26th overall at the time, and were declared ineligible for Division 1.

In 2018, Team United competed at the first WFTDA Continental Cup - North America East post-season tournament in Kalamazoo, Michigan. The team took home third place in the tournament, with a stunning 195-131 victory over  Mad Rollin' Dolls.

In 2019, Team United competed at the WFTDA Continental Cup - North America West post-season tournament in Orem, Utah. Team United lost to top-seeded Calgary Roller Derby in the team's second game, and finished the tournament in the consolation bracket.

Rankings

NR = no final ranking assigned this year
DNQ = did not qualify
 CR = consolation round

References

Sports in Des Moines, Iowa
Roller derby leagues established in 2013
Roller derby leagues in Iowa
2013 establishments in Iowa